Youssef Amyn (born 21 August 2003) is a German professional footballer who plays as a winger for Feyenoord.

Club career
A youth academy graduate of Viktoria Köln, Amyn made his professional debut on 13 March 2021 in a 3–1 league win against MSV Duisburg. This made him the youngest player to appear in a professional match for the club in its history.

On 1 September 2022, Amyn joined the under-21 team of Eredivisie club Feyenoord.

Career statistics

Honours
Viktoria Köln
 Middle Rhine Cup: 2020–21, 2021–22

References

External links
 
 

2003 births
Living people
German people of Iraqi descent
Footballers from Essen
Association football forwards
German footballers
3. Liga players
FC Viktoria Köln players
German expatriate footballers
German expatriate sportspeople in the Netherlands
Expatriate footballers in the Netherlands